The Goedgevonden Coal Mine is a coal mine located in Mpumalanga province in South Africa. The mine has coal reserves amounting to 200 million tonnes of coking coal, one of the largest coal reserves in Africa and the world. The mine has an annual production capacity of 6.7 million tonnes of coal.

References 

Coal mines in South Africa
Economy of Mpumalanga